The Third Sex may refer to:

 The Third Sex (band), American queercore band
 The Third Sex (film), working title for a 1957 German film Different from You and Me
 "The Third Sex", episode of 2002 TV series Taboo
 Das 3. Geschlecht ("The Third Sex"), a transvestite magazine in Weimar Germany

See also
Third gender, concept in which individuals are categorized, either by themselves or by society, as neither man nor woman